Sultiame (or sulthiame) is a sulfonamide and inhibitor of the enzyme carbonic anhydrase. It is used as an anticonvulsant.

History
Sultiame was first synthesised in the laboratories of Bayer AG in the mid 1950s and eventually launched as Ospolot in Europe and other markets the early 1960s. It never became a registered drug in the United States. The brand was transferred to Desitin GmbH in 1993 and is sold in several European countries, in Israel, Japan, and Australia.

Sultiame became established as a second-line drug for treatment of partial epilepsy in the 1960s and 1970s and was often used in combination with the established anticonvulsant phenytoin. Temporal lobe seizures appeared particularly responsive to sultiame. Doubts subsequently arose as to whether sultiame has intrinsic anticonvulsant properties. After discovering sultiame's ability to raise the blood levels of phenytoin, it was assumed that sultiame would only act in combination with phenytoin. This finding, together with the equivocal results of a study in the US, resulted in a quick decline of sultiame's use. It was only in 1988, that the German child neurologist Hermann Doose discovered its specific effects in benign focal epilepsies of childhood. Today,  sulthiame is the drug of choice for benign focal epilepsies of childhood (such as benign rolandic epilepsy) in the German-speaking countries and Israel.

Indications
Historically, sultiame has been used to treat partial seizures. In Australia, it is currently registered for behavioural disorders associated with epilepsy; hyperkinetic behaviour; temporal lobe epilepsy; myoclonic seizures; grand mal attacks; and Jacksonian seizures. In contrast to other sulfonamide drugs, sultiame is devoid of antibacterial activity.

Adverse effects

The more common adverse effects are ataxia, paraesthesia of face and limbs, hyperpnoea, dyspnoea, and anorexia. Less common adverse effects include giddiness, rash, Stevens–Johnson syndrome, nausea, weight loss, leukopenia, headache, psychic changes, depression, drooling, increased pain, frequency of fits, insomnia, status epilepticus. Disturbances in calcium and vitamin D metabolism have been occasionally reported after long-term use.

Interactions 

Sultiame taken together with primidone may lead to severe side-effects, including psychotic reactions. The addition of sulthiame to phenytoin therapy has shown to be followed by a rise in the serum levels of phenytoin. Sultiame may also lead to a rise of phenobarbitone blood levels. Alcohol must not be consumed during treatment.

Overdose
Vomiting, hypotension, headache, vertigo, ataxia, metabolic acidosis with hyperpnoea and catatonic state may occur. There is no specific antidote. It is not known whether dialysis may help in case of overdose.

Synthesis

Sulfanilamide can be reacted with ω-chlorobutylsulfonyl chloride and aqueous sodium carbonate to form the presumed intermediate (middle), which spontaneously cyclizes to give the drug.

References 

Anticonvulsants
Sulfonamides
Carbonic anhydrase inhibitors
Thiazines
Sultams
Sulfur–nitrogen compounds